Matthew Ryan Araiza (born May 16, 2000) is an American football punter who is a free agent. He played college football for the San Diego State Aztecs, setting the National Collegiate Athletic Association (NCAA) season record for average punt yardage as a junior. Araiza entered the National Football League (NFL) as a sixth-round selection by the Buffalo Bills in the 2022 NFL Draft, but he was released prior to the 2022 season after being accused of gang rape.

Early life and high school
Araiza grew up in San Diego, California, and attended Rancho Bernardo High School, where he played football, soccer, and was a hurdler on the track and field team. He made 37 field goals and was a two-time All-America selection as a placekicker. Araiza committed to play college football at San Diego State University (SDSU) over offers from the University of Massachusetts Amherst and the University of Montana.

College career
At SDSU, Araiza redshirted his true freshman season for the Aztecs. He also served as the backup to All-Mountain West Conference kicker John Baron II. Araiza became the team's placekicker as a redshirt freshman and made a school-record 22 field goals on 26 attempts and was named honorable mention All-Mountain West. Araiza made 10 of 14 field goal attempts in SDSU's COVID-19-shortened 2020 season and was named honorable mention All-Mountain West for a second straight season. He also assumed punting duties during the team's opening game against UNLV and averaged 49.8 yards on five punts.

In 2021, Araiza was named first-string punter in addition to his kicking duties going into his redshirt junior season and was named a mid-season All-American by ESPN at the position. He finished the season averaging 51.19 yards per punt, breaking the NCAA record set by Texas A&M's Braden Mann in 2018 (50.98) and earning himself the nickname "Punt God" from fans. Araiza has stated that he does not "necessarily love the nickname", though he recognized it as a "huge compliment". Araiza won the Ray Guy Award as the top punter in the nation, and he became the second player in Aztecs history to be named a unanimous All-American. Following the end of the season, Araiza announced that he would be forgoing his final season of eligibility to enter the 2022 NFL Draft.

Professional career

Buffalo Bills
The Buffalo Bills selected Araiza in the sixth round with the 180th overall pick of the 2022 NFL Draft. He was the third punter selected in the draft. As a rookie, he was named the Bills starting punter following the release of veteran Matt Haack. Araiza did not dress for the Bills' final preseason game on August 26, 2022, one day after a lawsuit accusing him and two former SDSU teammates of rape became public. He was released the next day, on August 27. The Bills said they had become aware of the allegations against Araiza in July, after he was drafted.

On February 16, 2023, Galgos de Tijuana of the Liga de Fútbol Americano Profesional (LFA) announced that Araiza had signed with the team; however, days later, his agent denied that he had signed.

Personal life
Araiza is of Mexican descent through his father, Ricardo, who was born in Mexico. His father played football as a wide receiver and kicker at Bonita Vista High School.

Gang rape allegations 
In 2022, Araiza was named as a defendant in a civil case in which he and two SDSU teammates were accused of gang raping a then-17-year-old girl, who was under the age of consent in California, at an off-campus party in 2021. Araiza has denied the allegations, with his agent stating, "The facts of the incident are not what they are portrayed in the lawsuit or in the press." Araiza's lawyer described the allegations as "a money grab" from the accuser, while the accuser stated that she reported the incident the day after the alleged rape, before she was aware of Araiza's background. The San Diego County District Attorney's Office did not file criminal charges against Araiza or the other two teammates, stating that prosecutors decided that "there is no path to a potential criminal conviction".

References

External links
 San Diego State Aztecs bio

Living people
2000 births
American football punters
San Diego State Aztecs football players
Players of American football from San Diego
American football placekickers
American sportspeople of Mexican descent
All-American college football players
Buffalo Bills players